Karen Smith may refer to:

Sportspeople
Karen Smith (Australian field hockey) (born 1979), Australian field hockey player
Karen Smith (New Zealand field hockey) (born 1970), New Zealand field hockey player
Karen Smith (diver) (born 1976), British Olympic diver
Karen Smith (tennis) (born 1961), Australian tennis player

Others
Karen Brucene Smith, winner of the Miss International title in 1974
Karen Rose Smith, American writer of over 55 romance novels
Karen E. Smith (born 1965), American mathematician
Karen A. Smith, New Zealand management academic
Karen R. Smith, professor at Southwestern Law School
Karen Smith, a fictional character from the film Mean Girls, portrayed by Amanda Seyfried
Karen Elaine Smith, victim in the 2017 North Park Elementary School shooting